John Docherty (born 30 October 1997) is a Scottish professional boxer. He won a bronze medal at the 2018 Commonwealth Games representing Scotland in the middleweight division.

Amateur career
Docherty won the British junior championships in 2012 and 2013. In 2015, he won gold at the Commonwealth Youth Games and silver at the European Youth championships. In 2017, Docherty won gold at the Scottish Elite Championships and the GB Three Nations Championships at senior level. He won a bronze medal at the 2018 Commonwealth Games.

Professional career
In 2018, Docherty turned professional signing a promotional deal with Matchroom Boxing. On 13 October, he won his professional debut with an 18 second knockout over Jordan Latimer.

Professional boxing record

References

External links
 

1997 births
Living people
Scottish male boxers
Sportspeople from Inverness
Middleweight boxers
Super-middleweight boxers
Boxers at the 2018 Commonwealth Games
Commonwealth Games bronze medallists for Scotland
Commonwealth Games medallists in boxing
Southpaw boxers
Medallists at the 2018 Commonwealth Games